Sami Lopakka is a Finnish guitarist and author. He was one of two guitarists for the metal band Sentenced until it disbanded (1989–2005). He was the band's main lyricist and was also considered to be the spokesman for the band.

Since 2007, Lopakka has been the guitarist and main songwriter for the Russian-singing Finnish metal band KYPCK, with whom he plays a custom baritone guitar built around a Kalashnikov AK-47 assault rifle by Amfisound Guitars.

As an author, Lopakka's debut novel Marras was published in January 2014 by Like Kustannus Oy in Finland. His short story Uudet lasit was published in the Finnish edition of Granta literary magazine in the same year.

Sources 
 Sentenced HomeGrave – Sentenced's official website
 KYPCK Ground Zero – KYPCK's official website
 KYPCK Headquarters – KYPCK's official Facebook page
 Book publisher's website

Finnish guitarists
Finnish male guitarists
University of Oulu alumni
Living people
1975 births
21st-century guitarists
21st-century male musicians